Lake Superior and Ishpeming Railroad No. 33 is a preserved SC-1 class 2-8-0 "consolidation" type steam locomotive originally built by the Baldwin Locomotive Works in April 1916 for the Munising, Marquette and Southeastern Railway as No. 44. In 1924, the MM&SE was purchased by the Lake Superior and Ishpeming Railroad and the locomotive was renumbered to 33. It served the LS&I by pulling heavy iron ore trains until it was retired from revenue service in 1962. The following year, it was sold to the Marquette and Huron Mountain tourist railroad to operate in excursion service, but instead sat idle in Marquette. In 1965, No. 33 was purchased by the founders of the Hocking Valley Scenic Railway in Ohio. Rebuilt to operating condition, No. 33 ran on the HVSR for many years before being sidelined in 1996 for an FRA-required overhaul that couldn't be accomplished. In 2003, No. 33 was traded to the Ohio Central Railroad and was overhauled for some occasional excursion runs between 2005 and 2008. The locomotive briefly operated again around the Age of Steam Roundhouse between 2018 and 2020. As of 2023, No. 33 is sidelined, awaiting to go through a 1,472-day inspection.

History

Original service life 
The Munising, Marquette and Southeastern Railway was a short-line railroad that was incorporated in 1911 in the central Upper Peninsula of Michigan alongside the Lake Superior and Ishpeming Railroad. At its height, the railroad operated 140 miles of trackage, which was used to help the timber operations then active in northern Michigan. In the mid-1910s, when World War I broke out, the LS&I and MM&SE designed and ordered a new class of 2-8-0 "consolidation" types from the Baldwin Locomotive Works of Philadelphia, Pennsylvania; the LS&I ordered three while the MM&SE only ordered one. The MM&SE locomotive was No. 33, which was numbered 44 at the time. It was needed to haul the long and heavy iron ore drags from the Princeton-Gwinn ore district, which was then producing much high-grade ore, to Marquette. The terrain between this district and Marquette, the ore port, was somewhat different than the 1.6% grade between Negaunee and Ishpeming, in that there were two heavy but shorter grades through and out of Gwinn and one longer six-mile grade between Little Lake and Carlshend, where it was necessary to "double" the hill, despite the force of No. 44's tractive effort of 55,900 pounds. No. 44, as well as the LS&I locomotives quickly became the world's most powerful 2-8-0s, and they were nicknamed "hogs".

In 1924, the MM&SE became purchased by the LS&I, so they'd increase their locomotive roster and the size of their map. Afterwards, the hogs were reclassified as SC-1s and were initially renumbered 30-33. One year later, the LS&I purchased two former Chicago River and Indiana 2-8-0s 1 and 2 from the General Equipment Company, and while they were renumbered 30 and 31, the SC-1s 30 and 31 became 34 and 35. Between 1925 and 1927, almost all the SC-1s, with the exception of No. 34, were given booster trucks beneath their tenders, which increased their tractive effort to 67,725 pounds, but this figure was raised to 72,309 pounds when the tractive effort of each locomotive was boosted to 60,484 pounds in an eventual rebuilding process. Until the arrival of the LS&I's 2-10-2 "Santa Fe" types from the Hocking Valley Railway in 1930, the SC-1s remained as the backbone of the LS&I's mainline ore services, as they muscled heavy car loads of iron ore trains, but they were unfrequently used during the winter, so their usage was prolonged. No. 33 continued to pull iron ore between Marquette, Negaunee, and West Ishpeming, and as the 1950s progressed, it was re-assigned for heavy switching whenever needed. By 1962, however, the LS&I had made a complete transition to diesel power, and No. 33 was retired in 1957 before it was stored in one of the LS&I's sidelines.

Preservation 
In 1963, the railroad sold eleven of their 2-8-0s, as well as some of their passenger cars, to former LS&I employee John A. Zerbal, who founded the Marquette and Huron Mountain Tourist Railroad. He had plans to operate all the steam locomotives he had purchased to help provide intensive services at a resort complex he had planned to serve. However, there are no known records of No. 33 pulling any trains for that railroad. Only three of the SC-4s, Numbers 19, 22, and 23, were ever known to pull tourist trains there between Marquette and Big Bay. Instead, No. 33 sat idle until 1965, when the locomotive was purchased by Frank L. McCauley, Ted Goodman, and Jerry Ballard, whom also had plans to create a tourist railroad. At first, it was planned to be called the "Salt Creek Railroad", as they wanted to operate it over Ex-Detroit, Toledo and Ironton trackage that lead to Wellston, Ohio. However, the trackage was already ripped up before details of the line could be finalized. In 1968, they decided to change the name of the planned operation to the Hocking Valley Scenic Railway right after purchasing the Monday Creek line.

No. 33 was moved to the Chesapeake and Ohio's Parson Yard roundhouse to begin restoration work, which included the removal of the booster trucks from the tender, and in 1972, No. 33 was fired up and moved under its own power for the first time in ten years. It also pulled the HVSR's first train between Jackson and Oak Hill. In August the following year, No. 33 pulled a special excursion for the town of Jackson's centennial celebration. In 1976, the HVSR purchased their own enginehouse in Nelsonville, so No. 33 could be stored on their own property. In 1983, however, the Monday Creek short line was ripped up, but not before the HVSR moved their property, including No. 33, to the former C&O Armitage Subdivision remnant south of Nelsonville. Now, the HVSR lies between Nelsonville and Logan, and while being joined by a small fleet of diesel locomotives, No. 33 resumed in excursion service on HVSR's new trackage. However, No. 33's excursion career on the HVSR wouldn't last any longer; in 1995, the HVSR lost its original engine house as the land it stood on was purchased by another owner. In addition, the Federal Railroad Administration (FRA) introduced new federal boiler regulations and inspections for active steam locomotives after a recent incident from the Gettysburg Railroad of Pennsylvania. Without proper facility to perform the required overhaul, No. 33 was retired from the HVSR by the end of 1996, and it remained sidelined for the next seven years.

In 2003, Jerry Joe Jacobson, founder of the Ohio Central Railroad, approached an agreement with the HVSR to trade EMD gp10 No. 701 in exchange for No. 33. On September 22, the locomotive left HVSR property and arrived at the OC's Morgan Run shops to begin the restoration process. The estimated time for No. 33 to run again was in 2004 for that year's Trainfest, but then it was pushed to one more year. On November 5, 2005, No. 33 was test fired once again, and it only ran a few times in 2005, since there weren't any excursions that year other than the Polar Express Excursion. It wasn't until on April 19, 2008 when No. 33 pulled its first official excursion on the OC, which ran from Sugarcreek to Morgan Run as part of The Ohio Tourist Rail Association's convention. There were talks of running the locomotive again on July 10, but due to the owners' absence, the trip had to be cancelled. By the end of 2008, the OC was sold to the Genesee and Wyoming corporation, and Jacobson used most of the money he had received from the sale to construct the new Age of Steam Roundhouse in Sugarcreek, a museum filled with a steam locomotive collection in which No. 33 became a part of. After another ten years of inactivity, No. 33 was overhauled again with much needed firebox repairs, and it was brought back into service on November 11, 2018. It ran back and forth across the AOSR's yard until 2020, when the locomotive became due for its 1,472-day boiler inspection. As of 2023, No. 33 sits on display inside the AOSR along with the rest of the collection. No. 33's next overhaul is currently on the waiting list, as the AOSR is finishing the restoration process on McCloud River 2-8-2 No. 19, and they plan to overhaul Canadian Pacific 4-6-2 No. 1293 and cosmetically restore Reading 0-4-0 Camelback No. 1187. It will likely be a few more years before No. 33 will run again.

See also 

Grand Canyon Railway 29
 Western Maryland Scenic Railroad 734
Grand Trunk Western 6325
Canadian Pacific 1293
Southern Railway 1643

External links 

 Hocking Valley Scenic Railway Website
 Age of Steam Roundhouse website

Further reading 

 Unknown Author(1916). Railway and Locomotive Engineering; A Practical Journal of Motive Power, Rolling Stock and Appliances: Volume 29. Classic Reprint Series

References 

2-8-0 locomotives
Railway locomotives introduced in 1916
Standard gauge steam locomotives
Standard gauge locomotives of the United States
Individual locomotives of the United States
Freight locomotives
Baldwin locomotives
Lake Superior and Ishpeming locomotives
Preserved steam locomotives of Ohio